Lost Grove Lake is an artificial lake in Scott County, Iowa.

History
Construction on the main ramp began in mid to late June 2014.

References

Reservoirs in Iowa
Tourist attractions in Scott County, Iowa
Bodies of water of Scott County, Iowa